The 2009–10 Turkish Basketball League was the 44th season of the top professional basketball league in Turkey. The regular season leaders were Efes Pilsen, but Fenerbahçe Ülker defeated them in the play-offs 4–2.

Regular season standings

Playoffs

External links 
 Official Site
 TBLStat.net History Page

References 

Turkish Basketball Super League seasons
Turkish
1